Kari Innerå (born April 14, 1982 in Harstad) is a Norwegian gourmet chef who has won the Nordic Culinary Championships and the Culinary Olympics. Innerå is known for her restaurant Cru vin & kjøkken which she established in 2008 together with investor, former Olympic cross country ski champion Thomas Alsgaard. When she was headhunted to establish the gourmet restaurant Fru K at The Thief (hotel) in Oslo, Innerå was simultaneously introduced to a wider audience nationally and internationally.

Career
20 years old Innerå moved to London to apprentice under chef Marco Pierre White at the venerable gourmet restaurant Mirabelle (London restaurant) in London.

Restaurant
Along with Thomas Alsgaard, wine connoisseur Merete Bø and noted chef Terje Ness she opened the gourmet restaurant "Cru vin & kjøkken" in October 2008. The inspiration was taken from Willy's Wine Bar in Paris, and the wine cellar is one of Oslo's most extensive with over 1000 wines available. The award-winning
 restaurant focuses on local food, and grow their own fruit and vegetables in an allotment close to the city centre.

Wine theft
In the morning of May 2, 2011, thieves broke into Cru vine & kjøkken and stole 100 bottles of expensive wine and champagne worth US$40,000–50,000, including a Romanée-Conti, La Tâche Grand Cru 1972 and top wines from Château d'Yquem, Liger-Belair, Jacques Selosse and Dom Pérignon. Because some of the wines were absolutely irreplaceable, owner and chef Kari Innerå announced a bounty of US$10,000 for those who could contribute to the clarification of the robbery. The robbery was never solved.

Awards and merits
Culinary Olympics in Erfurt
On the national team in 2008, when Norway won gold.
On the national team, as the sole girl, in 2004 when Norway won bronze.
National Culinary Team
On the team from 2005-2008 
Nordic Culinary Championship
Gold in 2007
National Culinary Championship
Silver in 2007, when she worked at the Bagatelle
Bronze in 2005, when she worked at the 
6th place in 2004, when she worked at the 
The Hulda Award (Norwegian female chef of the year)
Gold in 2007 as a cook/chef de partie at Bagatelle restaurant
Silver in 2004
Silver in 2003
Norwegian Youth Culinary Team, Culinary Olympics in Erfurt
Bronze in 2004
Trophée Passion in Paris - international cooking competition with participants from 15 nations and a jury headed by top chef Pierre Gagnaire
Gold in 2006

References

1982 births
Living people
People from Harstad
Norwegian expatriates in the United Kingdom
Norwegian chefs
Norwegian restaurateurs
Women chefs
Women restaurateurs